The Six Bells is a public house in St Michael's Street in St Albans, Hertfordshire, England. The seventeenth-century timber-framed building is situated within the walls of the Roman city of Verulamium.

History
The pub is built on the site of a Roman bath house. This facility appears to have been damaged when Verulamium was sacked by Boudica in AD 60 or AD 61. After the city recovered, the baths were replaced on a different site.

The name of the pub refers to the bells of the medieval St Michael's Church nearby. The church at one time had six bells, although it now has more, the bell-tower having been rebuilt in the 19th century.

Conservation
The building has been protected since 1971 and is listed grade II by Historic England.

References

External links 
 website

Pubs in St Albans
Grade II listed pubs in Hertfordshire
Ancient Roman baths in England
Timber framed pubs in Hertfordshire